"Swamp Thing" is a song by British electronic music group the Grid. It was released on 23 May 1994 as a single and is included on the Grid's third album, Evolver (1994). It peaked at number three on the UK, Australian, and Danish singles charts and reached the top five in an additional seven countries, including Finland and Norway, where it reached number two. The song was later sampled in "Banjo Thing" by Infernal and "Swamp Thing" by Pegboard Nerds. NME magazine ranked it number 41 in their list of the 50 best songs of 1994.

Content
"Swamp Thing" is almost completely instrumental, consisting mainly of: drums, synthesizer sounds and banjo. The only vocals are Well alright, watch out, Feel alright and I just dig it, sampled from the 1973 reggae song "Papa Do It Sweet" by Lloyd & Patsy. The banjo part was written and performed by Roger Dinsdale – a folk musician who also played the guitar and the mandolin. Dinsdale died in July 2009.

Critical reception
Music writer and columnist James Masterton wrote, "I can detect a theme developing here over who can make the best dance record out of the silliest original idea. As if Doop wasn't bad enough we now have the Grid moving away from ambient dub and scoring their biggest hit ever with a dance track based on a banjo reel." He added that it "actually is quite inspired". Maria Jimenez from Music & Media remarked that "Grid storms through Europe with their banjo-ignited stormer". Andy Beevers from Music Week'''s RM Dance Update commented, "Part Two of the Grid's US travelogue takes us east from Texas [with their 1993 single "Texas Cowboys"] to the Deep South, where they successfully set frantic banjo picking against uptempo house beats to create a high energy hoe down." He also declared it as "a mad banjo and house hybrid [that] works surprisingly well." Another editor, James Hamilton described it as "a breezy progressive throbber."

Chart performance
"Swamp Thing" was very successful on the charts across several continents. In Europe, it soared to number two in Finland, Norway and Scotland. It was a top-10 hit also in Austria, Belgium, Denmark (number three), Iceland, Ireland, the Netherlands, Spain, Sweden, Switzerland and the United Kingdom. On the Eurochart Hot 100, it hit number four. In the UK, the single peaked at number three in its fifth week on the UK Singles Chart, on 26 June. It also reached number-one on Music Weeks Dance Singles chart. Additionally, it was a top-20 hit in Germany and a top-50 hit in France. Outside Europe, "Swamp Thing" reached number three in Australia as well as on the RPM Dance/Urban chart in Canada. It also peaked at number 41 in New Zealand. The single was awarded with a silver record in the UK with a sale of 200,000 copies and a platinum record in Australia, after 70,000 units were sold.

Music video
"Swamp Thing" was accompanied by a music video. The video switches back and forth between two scenes: computer-generated imagery of a group of robots dancing to a techno beat and a blank white landscape with a crawling baby and music synthesiser instruments. The scene with the baby and the instruments also inspired the Evolver album cover art. The video received heavy rotation on MTV Europe and was A-listed on Germany's VIVA. Later it was published by Vevo on YouTube, and as of December 2022, the video had generated more than 2,3 million views.

Track listings

 12-inch single, UK "Swamp Thing" (Grid Southern Comfort Mix)
 "Swamp Thing" (Deep Dub Piece)
 "Swamp Thing" (Deep Piece Mix)

 CD single, UK "Swamp Thing" (Radio Mix) – 3:56
 "Swamp Thing" (Southern Comfort Mix) – 7:10
 "Swamp Thing" (Deep Dub Piece) – 7:10
 "Swamp Thing" (Deep Piece Mix) – 8:53

 Cassette single, UK'''
 "Swamp Thing" (Radio Mix)	
 "Swamp Thing" (Deep Piece Mix)
 "Swamp Thing" (Radio Mix)	
 "Swamp Thing" (Deep Piece Mix)

Charts

Weekly charts

Year-end charts

Certifications

References

External links
 [ "Swamp Thing"] on AllMusic

1994 singles
1994 songs
Deconstruction Records singles
Music Week number-one dance singles
Songs written by David Ball (electronic musician)
The Grid songs